Gjirokastër Castle (Albanian: Kalaja e Gjirokastrës or Kalaja e Argjirosë) is a fortress in Gjirokastër, Albania (during Ottoman rule it was historically known as Ergiri while local Greeks referred to it as Argyrokastro, a name applied also to the castle).

The castle dominates the town and overlooks the strategically important route along the river valley. It is open to visitors and contains a military museum featuring captured artillery and memorabilia of the Communist resistance against German occupation, as well as a captured United States Air Force plane to commemorate the Communist regime's struggle against the imperialist western powers.

History 
The citadel has existed in various forms since before the 12th century.  Princess Argjiro inspired Albanian author Ismail Kadare in a poem he wrote in the 1960s. According to local Albanian folkloric traditions she lived in the 15th century and jumped off Gjirokastër Castle along with her child so as to avoid being captured by the Ottomans.

Extensive renovations and a westward addition was added by Ali Pasha of Tepelene after 1812.  The government of King Zog expanded the castle prison in 1932.

Today it possesses five towers and houses, the new Gjirokastër Museum, a clock tower, two teke, a cistern, the stage of the National Folk Festival, and many other points of interest.

The castle's prison was used extensively by Zog's government and housed political prisoners during the Communist regime.

The castle is under protection from UNESCO.

Tourism  
The Gjirokastër Castle has also been a special destination for tourists. The castle was visited by over 10,000 Albanian and foreign tourists during January – May 2018. This was over double the visitors from the same period the year before, which saw 4,700 visitors.

Visitor Numbers

References

Castles in Albania
Buildings and structures in Gjirokastër
Tourist attractions in Gjirokastër County